Christian Netane Maumalanga (born December 15, 1971) is a former American football defensive tackle. He played college football at Kansas. He was drafted in the 4th round (128th overall) of the 1994 NFL draft by the New York Giants.

Early years
Maumalanga was born in Redwood City, California and attended Bishop Montgomery High School where he was named All-State in both football and track.

College career
Maumalanga attended Kansas where he was a four-year letter winner while majoring in business. As a sophomore, he recorded the first safety in Aloha Bowl history during the Jayhawks win over BYU. As a senior, he recorded 74 tackles and 7.5 sacks. He was also named first-team All-Conference and honorable mention All-American as a senior. He finished his senior season by winning the 1994 Hula Bowl defensive MVP award.

Professional career
Maumalanga was selected in the 4th round (128th overall) by the New York Giants. On July 25, 1994 during training camp Maumalanga got into a fight with offensive lineman Scott Davis. Maumalanga bloodied Davis after cutting him open with a one-and-a-half-inch gash from his forehead to his nose, which required five stitches to close. Later in 1994, Maumalanga  was involved in a locker room fight with Michael Strahan. Strahan dodged Maumalanga's initial punch and locked Maumalanga in a rear naked choke hold and held him there until the fight was broken up by teammates.

As a rookie, replacing an injured Coleman Rudolph, Maumalanga recorded five tackles against the Dallas Cowboys. He finished the season with seven total tackles, one forced fumble and one pass defensed.

In 1995 with the Arizona Cardinals he played in six games recording one tackle. In 1996, he played in one game.

In 1997, he spent time with the Kansas City Chiefs, St. Louis Rams and Chicago Bears. In 1999, he spent time with the Cleveland Browns. In 2000, also spent time on the off-season roster of the Oakland Raiders.

In 2000, he also played in the Arena Football League as an offensive lineman as well as a defensive lineman for both the Buffalo Destroyers and Houston ThunderBears. In his lone AFL season, he recorded eight tackles, one sack and two pass break-ups.
In 2001, he played for the New York/New Jersey Hitmen. For the league's lone season, he recorded 37 total tackles and four sacks.

Coaching career
Maumalanga also coached at Cathedral High School in Los Angeles.

Personal life
Growing up, Maumalanga was a member of a street gang. In June, 1995 during training camp, he knocked out linebacker, Mitch Davis, and had to be pulled off of him by two fellow linebackers, Pete Shufelt and Jessie Armstead. Not long after, Maumalanga got into a fight with future Hall of Fame defensive end Michael Strahan.

He has four children, Olivia, Matthew, Christian and Ana Elizabeth.

His cousin, Stephen Paea, was a second-round pick by the Chicago Bears as a defensive tackle and played seven seasons with the NFL.

Maumalanga founded the Tongan American Youth Foundation. He also coaches at Football University.

References

External links
 Football University bio

Living people
1971 births
American football defensive tackles
Kansas Jayhawks football players
New York Giants players
Arizona Cardinals players
Chicago Bears players
Kansas City Chiefs players
St. Louis Rams players
Cleveland Browns players
Oakland Raiders players
Buffalo Destroyers players
Houston ThunderBears players
New York/New Jersey Hitmen players
High school football coaches in California
Players of American football from California
Sportspeople from the San Francisco Bay Area
People from Redwood City, California